George Slater  (born 1864) was an English footballer who played in the Football League for Stoke.

Career
Slater played for Hanley United and joined Stoke in 1888. Slater, playing as a forward, made his Stoke and League debut on 6 October 1888 at Deepdale, the home of Preston North End. The visitors were overwhelmed and lost 7–0 to the eventual League Champions. Slater scored his debut and League goal on 13 October 1888 at Pike's Lane, the then home of Bolton Wanderers. With ten minutes to go Stoke were trailing 1–0 but Slater put Stoke level at 1–1 but a late Bolton goal saw Stoke lose 2–1.

He left Stoke in October 1888 when he decided to emigrate to the United States where he lived out the rest of his life.

Career statistics

References

English footballers
Stoke City F.C. players
English Football League players
Year of death missing
1864 births
Sportspeople from Walsall
Association football wingers